The 1994 Vuelta a España was the 49th edition of the Vuelta a España, one of cycling's Grand Tours. The Vuelta began in Valladolid, with an individual time trial on 25 April, and Stage 11 occurred on 5 May with a stage to Cerler. The race finished in Madrid on 15 May.

Stage 1
25 April 1994 — Valladolid to Valladolid,  (ITT)

Stage 2
26 April 1994 — Valladolid to Salamanca,

Stage 3
27 April 1994 — Salamanca to Cáceres,

Stage 4
28 April 1994 — Almendralejo to Córdoba,

Stage 5
29 April 1994 — Córdoba to Granada,

Stage 6
30 April 1994 — Granada to Sierra Nevada,

Stage 7
1 May 1994 — Baza to Alicante,

Stage 8
2 May 1994 — Benidorm to Benidorm,  (ITT)

Stage 9
3 May 1994 — Benidorm to Valencia,

Stage 10
4 May 1994 — Igualada to Andorra-Arcalís,

Stage 11
5 May 1994 — Andorra la Vella to Cerler,

References

01
1994,01